The 1930 Rome Grand Prix was a Grand Prix motor race held at the Circuito Tre Fontane on 25 May 1930. Maserati driver Luigi Arcangeli won the race, ahead of the shared works Bugatti of Guy Bouriat and Louis Chiron, and the privateer Bugatti of Heinrich Joachim von Morgen.

Entries

Starting grid

Classification

Race

 Louis Chiron took over the #30 Bugatti of Guy Bouriat on lap five, driving it for the remainder of the race.

References

Rome
Rome Grand Prix
Rome Grand Prix